Basècles is a village and district of the municipality of Beloeil, located in the Hainaut Province in Wallonia, Belgium.

The village has been a centre of black marble extraction. The village church dates from 1779. There is also a small 19th-century château, built by Jean-Baptiste Daudergnies, who participated in the construction of the Panama Canal.

References

External links

Populated places in Hainaut (province)